Shadowland is a young adult novel written by author Meg Cabot and published by Avon Books in 2000. It is the first part of The Mediator series. Its alternative title is Love You To Death.

Plot summary 
Sixteen-year-old Susannah 'Suze' Simon is a mediator, which means she can see and talk to ghosts. Suze spends a lot of time directing the usually unhappy dead to the afterlife. However, her job is not easy, as not all ghosts want to be guided. Every day, she is haunted by the fact that they will not leave her alone until she helps them resolve their unfinished business with the living.

Suze, whose father died when she was six, moves from New York to Carmel, California after her mom's second marriage to Andy Ackerman, a carpenter. She gets three stepbrothers, Jake, Brad, and David, whom she nicknames Sleepy (a senior), Dopey (a sophomore like Suze), and Doc (a seventh grader). However, when Suze arrives at her new home, she finds a handsome, archaic ghost named Jesse de Silva sitting on her window seat. Irritated, she tells Jesse to move on or find some other house to haunt, as now she is living there, but he refuses.

Suze hopes to start fresh in California, with trips to the beach instead of the cemetery and sunbathing instead of tending to lost souls. On her first day at the Junipero Serra Mission Academy, however, she is immediately faced with the angry ghost of Heather Chambers, the student whose place she took: Heather had committed suicide when her boyfriend Bryce Martinson broke up with her. Father Dominic, the school principal and a fellow mediator, is surprised to learn that Suze uses physical violence to subdue ghosts like Heather, and insists that she should use friendlier, more peaceful methods of mediation. Suze refuses, saying that she has done this job her whole life and is not going to change.

When Heather's old friends - including Bryce - begin to show interest in Suze, Heather claims Suze is taking over the life she had, and ignores all attempts to placate her. One night, after Heather attempts to kill Bryce, Suze sneaks out to the Mission to try and talk her into moving on, but Heather misconstrues her meaning, harbouring the false hope that she might get her life back. When Suze tries to explain that this is not the case, Heather enters a rage and tries to use her ghostly powers to kill Suze, who narrowly escapes with the help of Jesse.

The next day, Father Dom is unhappy with Suze's attempt to deal with Heather alone and the damage it has caused to the school grounds. She tries to explain that it was going to work, but that Heather's strength has reached unexpected levels. Several days later, Heather attempts to kill Bryce again, and is barely stopped by Father Dominic; both men are injured in the process. Furious, Suze returns to school that evening - ignoring Jesse's warnings - and performs a voodoo exorcism, successfully sending Heather to the afterlife. However, as she is exorcised, Heather causes the school breezeway to collapse on Suze, who is knocked unconscious and barely saved by Sleepy and Doc.

The next day, Suze learns that she has been elected vice-president of the sophomore class, replacing Heather. Although Father Dom is glad that the ghost is gone, he remains unimpressed with Suze's mediation techniques. He also informs her that Bryce has transferred to another high school, much to her dismay, but reminds her that it is for his safety. In her spare time, Suze researches Jesse's past, and, with Doc's help, she discovers that Jesse died 150 years ago under mysterious circumstances on his way to marry his cousin Maria. Suze later talks to Jesse, and while they set out some ground rules regarding his presence, she remains confused about her feelings towards him.

External links
Meg Cabot's Official Website
Meg Cabot Book Club

2000 American novels
American young adult novels
Novels by Meg Cabot
Novels set in California
Works published under a pseudonym
Avon (publisher) books